Hauger is a station on the Kolsås Line (line 3) on the Oslo Metro system. It is located between Kolsås and Gjettum,  from Stortinget. It serves the neighborhood Hauger and the mainly industrial area Rud. Two upper secondary schools Rud and Rosenvilde are located in its vicinity.

The station was opened on 1 January 1930 as part of the tramway Lilleaker Line.

References

Oslo Metro stations in Bærum
Railway stations opened in 1930
1930 establishments in Norway